Charles W. Crawford (July 21, 1888 – September 15, 1957) was an American chemist who served as Commissioner of Food and Drugs from 1951 to 1954.

References

1888 births
1957 deaths
American food chemists
Commissioners of the Food and Drug Administration
People from Lorena, Texas
Truman administration personnel
Eisenhower administration personnel